The Ambassador Cinema was Dublin's longest-running cinema and was operational on and off until 1999. It operated as a music venue between 2001 and 2008. The Ambassador's current use is as an exhibition hall and event centre.

The building was constructed as part of the Rotunda Hospital in 1764 as an assembly hall and social rooms on what is now called Parnell Street.

From 1897 onwards, the venue was given the name Rotund Room and hosted a number of "moving picture" screenings which were a great novelty at the time. From about 1908 onwards, it was used more regularly to show film presentations and in 1910 it became a full-time cinema, with 736 seats, a basic layout at the time.

Again known as the Rotunda (its nickname being the 'Roto' or the 'Roxy'), the cinema-going public thronged to the venue. Over the years, the cinema changed hands until the 1940s when it was run by Capitol and Allied Theatres Ltd.

In the 1950s, the cinema was redesigned, increasing the capacity to 1,200. Added to the main hall was a balcony (containing 500 seats) with private boxes. A new entrance area was also constructed. The cinema was reopened on 23 September 1954 as the Ambassador. It became a gala event venue, holding screenings of many films for the first time. Of note was the screening of The Blue Max in 1966, which was shot in Ireland. For the screening, a World War I plane adorned the roof of the cinema above the entrance.

In 1977, the cinema was forced to close briefly, but it reopened that summer under new ownership. The Green Group ran the cinema until 1988, and the cinema mainly played children's films such as The Care Bears Movie and its sequels. In 1988, with single-screen cinemas on the wane, it closed.

However, in 1994 it was given a new lease of life when it reopened under the ownership of Ward Anderson. Notable screenings upon reopening included Titanic, however, attendances were poor, most notably when a reissue of the 1935 film The Informer was screened to as few as two people per show. On 27 September 1999, after 45 years, the cinema closed.

This however was not the end of the venue. Entertainment promoters MCD Productions leased the building and for a number of years ran The Ambassador as a live music venue, until 2008. The Ambassador now hosts a variety of events including exhibitions, one-off concerts and corporate events.

Recent events include Bodies exhibition, CSI: The Experience, Dinosaur Encounters, Princess Exhibition, Game On, Santa's Playland, Xbox launch, Jameson Live presents White Lies, and running from Spring to Summer 2014, Lego exhibition The Art Of The Brick.

External links
Guide to venue on Ticketmaster
Reviews of various concerts in Ambassador Theatre, Dublin

Former cinemas in Dublin (city)
Parnell Square
1897 establishments in Ireland